John Benton (born June 23, 1969) is an American curler from Plymouth, Minnesota. He competed on John Shuster's team at the 2010 Vancouver Winter Olympics.

Curling career 
Benton started curling in 1975 and competed at his first and only U.S. Junior National Championship in 1987. He has competed at the United States Men's Championship ten times, his first in 1997. 

In 1991 Benton qualified for his first Olympic Trials but failed to make it to the Games. He would go on to compete in the Olympic Trials two more times, in 1997 and 2005, before finding success his fourth time in 2009.  Benton's team won the 2009 Trials which earned them a spot representing the United States at the 2010 Vancouver Olympic Games as well as the 2009 World Championship, since the Trials were also that year's National Championship. Benton played as lead on the team, which included John Shuster (skip), Jason Smith (third), and Jeff Isaacson (second). Chris Plys joined the team as alternate after the Olympic Trials. 

In April 2009, Benton's team participated in the Men's World Championship in Moncton, Canada. His team placed fifth with a 7–4 record. At the 2010 Olympics, Team USA finished 10th with a record of 2–7. After the Olympics Benton left the team to form his own team.

Benton was hired by NBC Sports to work as a curling analyst during the 2014 Winter Olympics.

At the 2017 United States Men's Championship Benton played second for Todd Birr. Team Birr earned a silver medal, losing to Team John Shuster in the final.

Benton has helped Jared Allen's team of ex-NFL players turned curlers, both as coach and alternate.

Personal life 
He is a member of the Beta Theta Pi fraternity's Beta Pi chapter at the University of Minnesota, Twin Cities campus.

Teams

References

External links 

1969 births
Living people
American male curlers
Curlers at the 2010 Winter Olympics
Curling broadcasters
Olympic curlers of the United States
People from Stillwater, Minnesota
People from St. Michael, Minnesota
People from Plymouth, Minnesota
American curling champions